{|

{{Infobox ship characteristics
|Hide header=
|Header caption=
|Ship type=
|Ship tons burthen=308,<ref name=Tyne>[http://www.tynebuiltships.co.uk/C-Ships/cambridge1803.html Tyne Built Ships: Cambridge.]</ref> or 309 (bm) 
|Ship length= 
|Ship beam= 
|Ship draft=
|Ship propulsion=
|Ship sail plan=
|Ship speed=
|Ship range=
|Ship complement=40
|Ship armament=16 × 6-pounder guns + 4 swivel guns
|Ship notes=
}}
|}Cambridge was launched in 1803 at Howdon, Newcastle upon Tyne. She made one or two voyages as whaler and then became a West Indiaman, and later traded across the Atlantic and with the Baltic. In 1814 she repelled an attack by a privateer in a single-ship action. She was sunk in May 1841 while returning to Newcastle on Tyne from Russia.

CareerCambridges first owner was Lord Camelford, a particularly violent former naval officer. When Camelford died three days after being wounded in a duel on 7 March 1804. His whalers, Cambridge,  (or Willding), and  passed to Lord Grenville, a relative by  marriage, who sold them when they returned from their voyages. 

Whaler: Captain Benjamin Thompson acquired a letter of marque on 30 January 1804. In February he sailed from London, bound for the Galápagos Islands. On 29 May Cambridge and Caerwent were at Rio de Janeiro. They were later reported to have arrived at Hood Island.Cambridge was again at Rio in July 1806, requiring food, water, and calefaction. This may have represented a second voyage. At some point her captains were reported as Buves, and Anthony. On 5 December 1806 Lloyd's List reported that Cambridge, Thompson, late master, and Caerwent, Anthony, master, were at the Cape of Good Hope,Cambridge returned to London on 12 May 1807. Lloyd's Register for 1807 still showed her master as Thompson, her owner as Rodgers, and her trade as London–South Seas. 

West Indiaman and general traderLloyd's List reported on 24 June 1808 that Cambridge, Sullivan, master, had had to put back into Havana, having been run into.

On 6 January 1814 Cambridge, Evans, master, arrived at Havana. She had repelled an attack by a Carthaginian privateer schooner of one gun and 80 men near Morro Castle (Havana). Two hours later the privateer captured a ship.

On 6 May 1825, Cambridge, Mason, master, rescued the crew and their belongings from the leaky and sinking Albert, Dixon, master. Albert had four feet of water in her hold that was rising at 18" per hour, even with her pumps working.

FateCambridge was last listed in Lloyd's Register in 1841 with the annotation "SUNK". She was sunk on 2 (or 4) May 1841 by ice in the Baltic Sea. A Russian ship rescued the crew. Cambridge'' was on a voyage from Reval, Russia to Newcastle upon Tyne.

Notes

Citations

References
 
 

1803 ships
Age of Sail merchant ships of England
Whaling ships
Maritime incidents in 1841